Who Gets the Last Laugh? is an American hidden camera comedy television series that debuted April 16, 2013, on TBS. The series pits some of the industries most well-known comedians vs. comedy actors against one another to see who can pull the most outrageous practical jokes.

Premise
Three guest comedians must dream the funniest and most outrageous pranks possible, then successfully unleash their ideas on an unsuspecting public. A live audience then determines which comedy star really got the "last laugh", with the winner earning $10,000 to be given to the charity of their choice.

Episodes

See also
 List of practical joke topics

References

External links
 
 

2013 American television series debuts
2013 American television series endings
2010s American comedy game shows
2010s American sketch comedy television series
English-language television shows
American hidden camera television series
TBS (American TV channel) original programming
Television series by Warner Horizon Television